A Hirayama family of asteroids is a group of minor planets that share similar orbital elements, such as semimajor axis, eccentricity, and orbital inclination. The members of the families are thought to be fragments of past asteroid collisions. 

Strictly speaking, families and their membership are identified by analysing the so-called proper orbital elements rather than the current osculating orbital elements, which regularly fluctuate on timescales of tens of thousands of years. The proper elements are related constants of motion that are thought to remain almost constant for times of at least tens of millions of years. 

The Japanese astronomer Kiyotsugu Hirayama (1874–1943) pioneered the estimation of proper elements for asteroids, and first identified several of the most prominent families in 1918.

Kiyotsugu Hirayama initially identified the Koronis, Eos, and Themis families, and later recognized also the Flora and Maria families. For a list of known families, see .

References 
 

Asteroid groups and families